Tâmboești is a commune located in Vrancea County, Romania. It is composed of five villages: Pădureni, Pietroasa, Slimnic, Tâmboești and Trestieni. It also included Obrejița village until 2004, when it was split off to form a separate commune.

At the 2011 census, of the inhabitants for whom data were available, 50.3% were Romanians and 49.7% were Roma. 86.6% were Romanian Orthodox, 9.7% Pentecostal, 2.4% Adventist and 1.2% Old Calendar Romanian Orthodox.

References

Communes in Vrancea County
Localities in Muntenia